.vn is the country code top-level domain (ccTLD) for Vietnam.

The domain name registry for .vn is the Vietnam Internet Network Information Center (VNNIC).
In 2003, the company Dot VN, Inc. signed an agreement with the VNNIC allowing it to market the .vn domain name abroad. 
Nowadays, a .vn domain name can be registered from all over the world via a worldwide .vn accredited registrar system.

The number of national domain name ".vn" surpassed 500,000 domains, ranked first in Southeast Asia & ASEAN and ranked TOP 10 in the Asia-Pacific region in terms of number of domain names maintained in use.

.vn domain names with 1 or 2 characters are registered through an auction.

There are 43 1-character .vn domain names, including: 36 domain names with a plain ASCII character (a, b, c, .. .x, y, z, 0, 1, 2, 3, .. 7, 8 , 9.vn) and 7 domain names with a Vietnam-specific character (â, ă, đ, ê, ô, ơ, ư.vn). There are 1296 2-character domain names with a combination of ASCII characters (a0, a1, a2, ..., z7, z8, z9.vn).

Second-level domains
The .vn domain name may be registered as a ccTLD or country code second-level domain (ccSLD). Below is a list of ccSLDs under the .vn domain name.

References

External links
 IANA .vn whois information

Country code top-level domains
Internet properties established in 1994
Internet in Vietnam

sv:Toppdomän#V